Koremaguia is a genus of moths in the family Pterophoridae containing only one species, Koremaguia alticola, which is found in India (the Andaman Islands).

References

Platyptiliini
Monotypic moth genera
Moths of Asia